The twenty-second series of Made in Chelsea, a British structured-reality television programme began airing on 11 October 2021, and concluded after twelve episodes on 27 December. Unlike the previous two series, the cast were back in its usual location of Chelsea without having to quarantine together due to the government guidelines and restrictions for the COVID-19 pandemic being dropped in the UK. 

The series included a couple of new cast members including Nicole Berry and Sarrah Jasmin, as well as the return of former cast Angus Findlay, Digby Edgley and Sam Prince. They replace Alex Mytton who did not return for this series. The series heavily focused on the love triangle between Ruby, Reza and Miles, as well Olivia and Tristan getting back together, and Inga exploring her sexuality. It also featured bumps in the roads for both James and Maeva, and Emily and Harvey.

Cast

Episodes

Ratings
Catch-up service totals were added to the official ratings.

External links

References

2021 British television seasons
Made in Chelsea seasons